Sinéad Ní Neachtain (born 1977) is an Irish editor.

Ní Neachtain is a former editor of Galway Now magazine. A native of Inverin, she is part of a family of five. She re-located to Boston, Massachusetts with her family when she was ten years old, but returned two years later, and attended Coláiste Chroí Mhuire Secondary School in Spiddal. Following her graduation from Dublin City University (DCU) with an Honours Degree in Journalism, Sinéad began her broadcasting career with RTÉ.

She started working on RTÉ 2fm and subsequently moved to RTÉ Radio 1 where she worked on Morning Ireland. She spent three to four years as a sub-editor on Radio One News and was the youngest newsreader in the country at 20 years of age. During this time, she also edited Lifetime and Citywide News Newspapers. Moving back to Galway, she undertook a Diploma in Irish and Computers and joined the newsroom in TG4 as a television reporter. Following that she joined the Galway Bay FM newsroom and produced the station's current affairs programme.

In 2005, she became Group Editor of Golden Egg Productions, which publishes Galway Now, Limerick Now and Weddings Now magazines.

She is married to broadcaster Jimmy Norman.

External links
 http://www.galwayindependent.com/profiles/profiles/sin%e9ad-n%ed-neachtain-%11-editor,-%27galway-now%27/

1977 births
20th-century Irish people
21st-century Irish people
Irish women radio presenters
Living people
Alumni of Dublin City University
Galway Bay FM presenters
Irish magazine editors
Irish women editors
People from County Galway
RTÉ newsreaders and journalists
TG4 presenters
Irish women journalists